Villa Alba at 44 Walmer St, Kew, is a museum in the State of Victoria,  Australia. It was built and decorated between 1882 and 1884 for Anna Maria McEvoy and her husband, William Greenlaw who was the General Manager of the Colonial Bank of Australasia in Melbourne. Villa Alba is located in Kew opposite Studley Park adjacent the Yarra River. The Yarra separated the Greenlaw's Villa Alba from the working class terrace houses located on the other side of the river in Abbottsford and Collingwood. An early photo shows that the villa was surrounded by the McEvoy's neighbouring larger property. The Paterson Bros. firm of decorators, then at the height of its reputation, was commissioned by the Greenlaws for the decoration of Villa Alba in 1883 and 1884.

Significance
Villa Alba is of state significance to the state of Victoria (Australia) for the outstanding late Victorian painted decoration of its interior.  The decorative scheme is of significance as a rare surviving example of the work of the Scottish-born, Melbourne based decorators, the Paterson Brothers. It is one of their first domestic  interiors and differs from the usual repetitive wallpapers of that era. The painted and stencilled decorative schemes in the ground floor hall, the dining room, the drawing room, the vestibule, the stair hall, the upper hall, principal bedroom and the boudoir are also individually of significance as outstanding examples of Victorian decoration.

Interior
Villa Alba is a two-storey home with rendered masonry walls and a slate roof. The house stands opposite Studley Park, overlooking the Yarra River in Melbourne, Australia. It is believed that there was an earlier weatherboard house on the site which was built in 1863. In 1883 to 1884 the present house was built for William Greenlaw and his wife Anna Maria (nee McEvoy). The house's architectural style and its tower are a landmark in the neighborhood and it retains its original surroundings now surrounded by the school and neighbouring residences. However, it is the interior which is the most remarkable feature of Villa Alba. The interior of the house was elaborately decorated by the Paterson Bros. a company of three Scottish brothers who undertook many commissions to decorate wealthy homes in Melbourne during the economic boom following the gold rush and during the period known as 'Marvellous Melbourne'. The Paterson Bros. decorated Villa Alba in Kew along with other notable public buildings such as The Royal Exhibition Building, the Ballroom and Private Apartments at Government House, Melbourne Town Hall, the Parliamentary Library and the Prahran Public Library.

History
Villa Alba was originally given to Anna Maria McEvoy as a wedding gift on her marriage to William Greenlaw who rose through the ranks to become the General Manager of one of Victoria’s early banks, the Colonial Bank of Australasia which suffered during the depression of the 1890s.

After William's death in 1895 Anna Maria sold the contents and moved out in 1897. The house was leased out and later sold to the Fripp family who owned it until 1949 when it was sold to the [Royal] Women’s Hospital who used it as a Nurses Home and built the Henry Pride Convalescent Wing in Nolan Ave which opened in 1954. During this time the intricately decorated walls were covered in white paint to 'brighten up' the place. Fortunately the ceilings were not overpainted.

From 1973 the site was repurposed as the  Henry Pride Geriatric Centre operated by the Mount Royal Hospital.  The new Centre provided care for elderly patients in what was at first a 72-bed facility. The Geriatric Centre operated at Villa Alba until 1992.

In 2004 the title was transferred to Villa Alba Museum Inc.

References 

Historic house museums in Victoria (Australia)